This article details the complete work of an Australian-born composer and music producer JG Thirlwell, from his beginnings in 1980 to the present. It covers his output under multiple pseudonyms as well as his work as a collaborating artist and soundtrack composer.

As a solo artist

As Foetus

Studio albums

Live albums

Compilation albums

Remix albums

EPs

Singles

Music videos 
 "Need Machine"
 "Verklemmt" (1995)
 "Here Comes the Rain" (2010)

As Steroid Maximus

As Manorexia

As JG Thirlwell

Collaborative albums

With Wiseblood

Studio albums

Singles

With Flesh Volcano

With Lydia Lunch

Credits

Performance credits 
{| class="wikitable sortable"
|-
! width="33"| Year
! width="250"| Artist
! width="260"| Release
! width="170"| Role(s)
! width="480"| Song(s)
|-
| 1981
| Nurse with Wound
| Insect and Individual Silenced
| align="center"| Bass amp, jack plugs
| align="center"| "Alvin's Funeral (The Milk Was Delivered in Black Bottles)"
|-
| rowspan="3"| 1983
| rowspan="2"| Marc and the Mambas
| rowspan="2"| Torment and Toreros
| align="center"| Instruments
| align="center"| "A Million Manias"
|-
| align="center"| Drums
| align="center"| "Beat out that Rhythm on a Drum"
|-
| The The
| Soul Mining
| align="center"| Percussion
| align="center"| "Giant"
|-
| rowspan="5"| 1984
| Coil
| Scatology
| align="center"| Sampler
| align="center"| "Panic"
|-
| Nurse with Wound
| Brained by Falling Masonry
| align="center"| Vocals
| align="center"| "Brained by Falling Masonry"
|-
| Nurse with Wound/Current 93
| ''Nylon Coverin' Body Smotherin| align="center"| Vocals
| align="center"| "Brained by Falling Masonry"
|-
| Orange Juice
| The Orange Juice
| align="center"| Piano
| align="center"| "Salmon Fishing in New York"
|-
| Nick Cave and the Bad Seeds
| From Her to Eternity
| align="center"| unknown instruments during early recording sessions, uncredited
| align="center"|
|-
| rowspan="2"| 1985
| Annie Hogan
| Plays Kickabye
| align="center"| Percussion
| align="center"| "Burning Boats"
|-
| Nurse with Wound
| The Sylvie and Babs Hi-Fi Companion
| align="center"| Instruments
| align="center"| —
|-
| rowspan="2"| 1986
| Coil
| Horse Rotorvator
| align="center"| Sampler
| align="center"| "Circles of Mania"
|-
| Virgin Prunes
| The Moon Looked Down and Laughed
| align="center"| Instruments
| align="center"| —
|-
| rowspan="2"| 1987
| Coil
| Gold Is the Metal with the Broadest Shoulders
| align="center"| Instruments
| align="center"| "The Broken Wheel", "The Wheal"
|-
| Lydia Lunch
| Honeymoon in Red
| align="center"| Treatments
| align="center"| "Still Burning", "Fields of Fire", "Three Kings"
|-
| 1988
| rowspan="2"| PIG
| A Poke in the Eye... with a Sharp Stick
| align="center"| Instruments
| align="center"| "Peoria"
|-
| 1989
| Sick City
| align="center"| Instruments, additional vocals
| align="center"| "Sick City"
|-
| rowspan="2"| 1990
| Gumball
| Gumball
| align="center"| Backing vocals
| align="center"| "Yellow Pants"
|-
| Nurse with Wound
| Psilotripitaka
| align="center"| Instruments
| align="center"| "Duelling Banjos", "Registered Nurse Second Coming"
|-
| rowspan="3"| 1991
| Boss Hog
| Action Box
| align="center"| Vocals
| align="center"| "Black Throat"
|-
| Jarboe
| Thirteen Masks
| align="center"| Sampler, programming
| align="center"| "Red"
|-
| Lydia Lunch
| Twisted/Past Glas
| align="center"| Instruments, tapes
| align="center"| —
|-
| rowspan="3"| 1992
| Of Cabbages and Kings
| Hunter's Moon
| align="center"| Vocals
| align="center"| "Faucet"
|-
| Silverfish
| Organ Fan
| align="center"| Brass, additional vocals
| align="center"| "Fucking Strange Way to Get Attention"
|-
| Sovetskoe Foto
| The Humidity
| align="center"| Vocals
| align="center"| "Forget"
|-
| rowspan="2"| 1993
| Boss Hog
| Girl +
| align="center"| Vocals
| align="center"| "Not Guilty"
|-
| Workdogs
| Workdogs in Hell
| align="center"| Instruments
| align="center"| "Eulogy Regrets", "*"
|-
| 1994
| PIG & Sow
| Je M'Aime
| align="center"| Instruments
| align="center"| "Blood Sucking Bitch"
|-
| rowspan="3"| 1995
| Argyle Park
| Misguided
| align="center"| Spoken word
| align="center"| "Refuge"
|-
| Ann Magnuson
| The Luv Show
| align="center"| Spoken word
| align="center"| "Sex With the Devil"
|-
| Voivod
| Negatron
| align="center"| Sampler
| align="center"| "D.N.A. (Don't No Anything)"
|-
| 2000
| Melvins
| The Crybaby
| align="center"| Vocals, sampler
| align="center"| "Mine Is No Disgrace"
|-
| 2003
| Rotoskop
| Revolution: Lost
| align="center"| Vocals
| align="center"| "Mary Magdalene", "Paging Dr. Strong"
|-
| 2005
| Jarboe
| The Men Album
| align="center"| Vocals
| align="center"| "Bass Force/Angel Jim" (Low Rider mix)
|-
| 2007
| Strings of Consciousness
| Our Moon Is Full
| align="center"| Vocals
| align="center"| "Asphodel"
|-
| rowspan="2"| 2011
| Hypnoz
| A Score for Iron Blues
| align="center"| Vocals
| align="center"| "Night on Earth"
|-
| International Moods
| Frequent Traveller
| align="center"| Vocals
| align="center"| "Landing Time", "Don't Leave Home Without It"
|-
| 2012
| Cisfinitum & First Human Ferro
| Alchemicals
| align="center"| Voice
| align="center"| "New Cleansed Order"
|-
| 2013
| Melvins
| Everybody Loves Sausages
| align="center"| Vocals
| align="center"| "Station to Station"
|-
| 2014
| Elysian Fields
| For House Cats And Sea Fans
| align="center"| Sampler
| align="center"| "Escape From New York"
|-
| align="center" colspan="5" style="font-size:90%" | "—" denotes a credit for the entire release.
|}

 Production and mixing credits 

 Remixing credits 

 Composition credits 

 References General sources'''

External links 
Official website
JG Thirlwell at Discogs

Discographies of American artists
Rock music discographies